Mohan Ravi (born 10 September 1980), better known by his stage name Jayam Ravi, is an Indian actor who works in the Tamil film industry. He has won a Filmfare Award and three SIIMA Awards. The son of veteran film editor A. Mohan, Ravi made his debut as a Child artist in the Telugu film Bava Bavamaridi (1993), produced by his father. He has Won One Tamil Nadu State Film Award and One Filmfare Award South respectively.

The success of a later film Jayam prompted the title to become a prefix to his stage name, and he continued to collaborate with his brother for other films including M. Kumaran S/O Mahalakshmi (2004), Unakkum Enakkum (2006), Santhosh Subramaniam (2008) and Thani Oruvan (2015).

Early life and family
Jayam Ravi was born as Mohan Ravi in Tirumangalam, Madurai. His father is the veteran film editor A. Mohan, a Tamil Rowther and his mother is Telugu. his elder brother Mohan Raja is a film director, with most of his films featuring Ravi in the lead role, while his sister Roja is a dentist. Ravi grew up in both Chennai and Hyderabad. He completed his schooling at Jawahar Vidyalaya in Ashok Nagar, Chennai. He studied dancing under the Bharatnatyam dancer Nalini Balakrishnan and performed his arangetram at the age of 12. After completing his degree in Visual Communication from Loyola College, Chennai, he decided to get into the film industry. He also trained in acting at the Kishore Namit Kapur Institute in Mumbai. Before debuting as an actor, Ravi had been an assistant director to Suresh Krishna for Aalavandhan (2001), starring Kamal Haasan.

Acting career

1993–2008: Debut success
Ravi acted as a child actor in two Telugu films: Bava Bavamaridi and Palnati Pourusham, which were produced by his father. Jayam Ravi made his acting debut in the action-masala film Jayam, produced by his father and directed by his brother Mohan Raja. It was a remake of the 2002 Telugu film of the same name. His next venture was the sentimental drama M. Kumaran Son Of Mahalakshmi (2004), the remade version of the Telugu film Amma Nanna O Tamila Ammayi, in which he starred alongside Asin Thottumkal. Of Ravi's performance, a critic from Sify wrote that he "makes you want to see more of him", while The Hindus Malathi Rangarajan noted that he came out with an "appreciable portrayal throughout". The film, considered a family entertainer, received the Tamil Nadu State Film Special Award for Best Film and fetched Ravi himself the Tamil Nadu State Film Award for Best Actor. It also emerged a financial success.

His next release, Daas (2005), another action-masala flick, and his first original film following two remakes, featured him as a football player. The film took an even bigger opening than his previous ones. Sify's reviewer described his performance as "impressive", calling Ravi a "hundred percent convincing as an action hero". Mazhai, a remake of the Telugu film Varsham, was his other release that year, which was "lukewarm" at the box office.
In 2006, he starred in Saran's Idhaya Thirudan, which performed poorly at the box office, following which, he acted in Unakkum Enakkum (initially released and promoted as Something Something Unakkum Enakkum), again under his brother's direction in another remake of a Telugu film Nuvvostanante Nenoddantana. Ravi portrayed a rich, happy-go-lucky NRI from London, who has to live and fight for his love in dire conditions in a rural milieu. The film, which featured Trisha Krishnan alongside Ravi, became a high critical as well as financial success, emerging one of the highest-grossing and most-profitable films of the year. The N. Linguswamy-produced Deepavali under Ezhil's direction became his only 2007 release.

In 2008, Ravi appeared in three films. Following a cameo appearance in Velli Thirai, he acted in the family drama Santhosh Subramaniam, once again under his brother's direction in a remake. In the Tamil version of the 2006 Telugu film Bommarillu, starring opposite Genelia D'Souza, he played a young man, whose choices and wishes are continually subdued by his father. Ravi received a nomination for the Best Tamil Actor Award at the 56th Filmfare Awards South. Next, he starred in the action thriller Dhaam Dhoom, directed by cinematographer-director Jeeva, who died in the midst of the film's shooting in Russia. Completed by Jeeva's assistant Manikandan, his wife Aneez Tanveer and his guru P. C. Sreeram, Dhaam Dhoom released in mid-2008 in which he portrayed Gautham Subramaniyam, a man accused in a murder he did not commit. Sify's reviewer wrote that he was "simply amazing in his role", label the film as an "out and out Jayam Ravi movie", while Indiaglitz noted that Ravi was "probably the perfect choice to play the character".

2009–2019: Action and comedy roles
In 2009, he starred in the action-adventure film Peranmai. In 2010, he starred in the action-comedy Thillalangadi, a remake of the 2009 Telugu-language film Kick. In 2011, he starred in the romantic drama Engeyum Kaadhal. In 2013, he starred in the action film Ameerin Aadhi-Bhagavan. In 2014, he starred in the action film Nimirndhu Nil, which was also shot simultaneously in Telugu as Janda Pai Kapiraju with Nani in the lead.

In 2015, Ravi appeared in four films: the romantic comedy Romeo Juliet, the action-comedy Sakalakala Vallavan, the action-thriller Thani Oruvan (directed by his brother Mohan Raja) and the sports action film Bhooloham. In 2016, he starred in the action-horror film Miruthan revolving around a zombie apocalypse. In 2017, he appeared in the action-thriller Bogan (reuniting with actor Arvind Swami after Thani Oruvan) and the action-adventure film Vanamagan.

In 2018, he starred in the sci-fi action film Tik Tik Tik (considered as India's first space film) and the action-thriller Adanga Maru. In 2019, he made a cameo in the adventure film Thumbaa and starred as the lead in the comedy film Comali.

2021–present

In 2021, he made his debut in OTT platforms through his 25th film Bhoomi. He was seen in Mani Ratnam's Magnum Opus Ponniyin Selvan as Arulmozhivarman who later became the great Chola Emperor Raja Raja Chola.

Personal life
He has been married to Aarti, daughter of noted television producer Sujatha Vijayakumar since 2009. They have two sons: Aarav (born on 29 June 2010) and Ayaan (born 10 August 2014). Aarav played a role in his film Tik Tik Tik (2018). Filmography All films are in Tamil, unless otherwise noted.''

Awards and nominations

Notes

References

External links 

1980 births
Living people
Telugu people
20th-century Indian male actors
Tamil male actors
Indian Tamil people
Indian Hindus
Loyola College, Chennai alumni
Bharatanatyam exponents
Tamil Nadu State Film Awards winners
Male actors from Madurai
Male actors in Tamil cinema
21st-century Indian male actors